Daniel Heryanto Dewandaka (born 30 November 1969) is an Indonesian-born former professional tennis player who competed in Davis Cup tennis for both Indonesia and Singapore.

Born in 1969, Heryanto competed first for Indonesia and was a doubles gold medalist at the 1989 Southeast Asian Games in Kuala Lumpur, then the following year won two bronze medals at the 1990 Asian Games. He appeared in two Davis Cup ties for Indonesia during his career, against China in 1990 and India in 1991, for a 2/4 overall record.

Heryanto later became a permanent resident of Singapore through his time spent as national coach. Between 2003 and 2011 he featured in a total of 25 ties for the Singapore Davis Cup team primarily as a doubles player, while simultaneously serving as team captain. He won a team record 20 rubbers in doubles.

See also
List of Indonesia Davis Cup team representatives

References

External links
 
  (record for Indonesia)
  (record for Singapore)
 

1969 births
Living people
Indonesian male tennis players
Singaporean tennis players
Singaporean people of Indonesian descent
Competitors at the 1989 Southeast Asian Games
Southeast Asian Games medalists in tennis
Southeast Asian Games gold medalists for Indonesia
Southeast Asian Games bronze medalists for Indonesia
Tennis players at the 1990 Asian Games
Medalists at the 1990 Asian Games
Asian Games medalists in tennis
Asian Games bronze medalists for Indonesia